Runar Bauer (born October 16, 1952) is a Norwegian handball player.

He played for Kolbotn I.L. for several years, including the 1982/1983 season and the 1983/1984 season when Kolbotn won the National league.

At Kolbotn, he was joined by his two younger brothers Vidar Bauer and Hans Edvard Bauer.

Bauer scored 3 goals during his 4 appearances for the Norwegian National Team.

Towards the end of his career Bauer also played for Sarpsborg, at the time further down in the Norwegian league system.

References

Norwegian male handball players
1952 births
Living people